Symmerus lautus is a species of non-brachycera in the family Ditomyiidae.

References

Ditomyiidae
Articles created by Qbugbot
Insects described in 1869